Jaggan is a rural town and locality in the Tablelands Region, Queensland, Australia.

History
The area was originally called Bunjara Burra. The town takes its present name from the Jaggan railway station, which in turn was named by the Queensland Railways Department on 31 August 1915. Jaggan is an Aboriginal word meaning thick scrub with lawyer vines.

The town surveyed in October 1916.

Jaggan State School opened on 2 April 1918. In August 1924, the Queensland Government committed to constructing a new school building at a cost of £640. It closed in 1965.

References

External links 

 

Towns in Queensland
Tablelands Region
Localities in Queensland